The Grammy Award for Best Native American Music Album was an award presented at the Grammy Awards, a ceremony that was established in 1958 and originally called the Gramophone Awards, to recording artists for quality albums in the Native American music genre. Honors in several categories are presented at the ceremony annually by the National Academy of Recording Arts and Sciences of the United States to "honor artistic achievement, technical proficiency and overall excellence in the recording industry, without regard to album sales or chart position".

Following a three-year lobbying effort by Ellen Bello, founder of the Native American Music Awards and the Native American Music Association, the Grammy award was first presented to Tom Bee and Douglas Spotted Eagle in 2001 as the producers of the compilation album Gathering of Nations Pow Wow. Previously, Native American recordings had been placed in the folk, world or new-age music categories. While some Native American artists criticized the award category for being "too narrowly defined to accommodate the breadth of today's Indian music", others took pride in its inclusion. The name of the award remained unchanged between 2001 and 2011. According to the category description guide for the 52nd Grammy Awards, the award was presented to "vocal or instrumental Native American music albums containing at least 51% playing time of newly recorded music", with the intent to honor recordings of a more "traditional nature".

As performing artists, Bill Miller and Mary Youngblood share the record for the most wins in this category, with two each. Thomas Wasinger holds the record for the most wins as a producer, with three. The group Black Lodge Singers holds the record for the most nominations without a win, with seven. In 2011, the category Best Native American Music Album was eliminated along with thirty others due to a major overhaul by the Recording Academy. Four additional categories in the American Roots Music field were eliminated (Best Contemporary Folk Album, Best Hawaiian Music Album, Best Traditional Folk Album, Best Zydeco or Cajun Music Album). Native American works will now be eligible for the Best Regional Roots Music Album category.

Recipients

 Each year is linked to the article about the Grammy Awards held that year.

See also
 List of Grammy Award categories
 List of Native American musicians

References

General
 

Specific

 
2001 establishments in the United States
2011 disestablishments in the United States
Album awards
Awards disestablished in 2011
Awards established in 2001
Native American Music Album